San Patricio is a town and district located in the Misiones department in Paraguay.

Populated places in the Misiones Department